Ferdinand Oliver Porsche (born 13 March 1961 in Stuttgart), son of Ferdinand Alexander Porsche and great-grandson of automotive pioneer Ferdinand Porsche, is an Austrian-German entrepreneur and member of the Supervisory Boards within the Volkswagen Group. He completed his legal studies with a Doctor's Degree in Law from the University of Salzburg, subsequently taking his MBA at the University of Toronto.

He is a member of board of directors of Porsche Automobil Holding along with Wolfgang Porsche, Hans Michel Piech, Josef Michael Ahorner, Stefan Piëch, Peter Daniell Porsche and Hans-Peter Porsche. He also sit on the supervisory board of separately listed Volkswagen AG.

References 

1961 births
Living people
Businesspeople from Stuttgart
Ferdinand Oliver
University of Salzburg alumni
University of Paris alumni
Alumni of the University of London
University of Toronto alumni

Automotive businesspeople